Shearing Bossa Nova is a 1963 album by George Shearing accompanied by "woodwinds and a Brazilian rhythm", and arranged by Clare Fischer.

Reception

Stephen Cook reviewed the album for Allmusic and wrote that "On the heels of wildly popular and PR department-treated mambo ventures like Latin Escapade and Latin Lace, Shearing took on the bossa nova craze of the early '60s with this long player...Shearing fans certainly will find a lot here to enjoy. Highlights include the Fischer originals "Samba da Borboleta" and "Pensativa." "

Track listing 
 "One Note Samba" (Antonio Carlos Jobim, Newton Mendonça, Jon Hendricks) - 2:43
 "Blue Prelude" - 2:30
 "Desafinado" (Jobim, Mendonça) - 2:18
 "Nevermore" - 3:08
 "Samba Da Borboleta (Butterfly Samba)" (Clare Fischer) - 2:21
 "Pensativa" (Fischer) - 2:44
 "On Green Dolphin Street" (Bronisław Kaper, Ned Washington) - 2:33
 "Come Rain or Come Shine" (Harold Arlen, Johnny Mercer) - 2:56
 "Manhã de Carnaval (Morning of the Carnival)" (Luiz Bonfá, Antônio Maria) - 2:17
 "Algo Novo" - 3:10
 "Black Satin" - 3:53
 "Amazona's Legend" - 2:38

Personnel 
George Shearing - piano
Clare Fischer - arranger, conducting

References

1963 albums
Albums arranged by Clare Fischer
Bossa nova albums
George Shearing albums
Capitol Records albums
Instrumental albums